Panau is a genus of moths in the family Cossidae.

Species
 Panau adusta (Roepke, 1957)
 Panau borealis Yakovlev, 2004
 Panau bretschneideri Yakovlev, 2013
 Panau brunnescens (Roepke, 1957)
 Panau eichhorni (Roepke, 1957)
 Panau goliathi Yakovlev, 2011
 Panau princeps (Roepke, 1957)
 Panau quarlesi (Roepke, 1957)
 Panau speideli Yakovlev, 2011
 Panau stenoptera (Roepke, 1957)
 Panau variegata (Roepke, 1957)

Etymology
The genus name is derived from Indonesian panau (meaning a white spot on the skin).

References

 , 2004: New taxa of Cossidae from SE Asia. Atalanta 35(3-4): 369-382.
 , 2011: Catalogue of the family Cossidae of the Old World (Lepidoptera). Neue Entomologische Nachrichten 66: 1-129.
 , 2013: Preliminary data on the Cossidae (Lepidoptera) for Arunachal-Pradesh State, North-East India, with a description of a new species. Euroasian Entomological Journal, 12 (1): 98-102.
 , 2009: The Carpenter Moths (Lepidoptera:Cossidae) of Vietnam. Entomofauna Supplement 16: 11-32.

External links
Natural History Museum Lepidoptera generic names catalog

Zeuzerinae